Aspidosperma olivaceum is a timber tree native to Southeast Brazil. It is common in Atlantic Forest, Cerrado, Caatinga, and Pantanal vegetation.

References

olivaceum
Trees of Brazil
Endemic flora of Brazil
Plants described in 1860